The Selfoss men's handball team is the men's handball section of Icelandic multi-sport club Selfoss from Selfoss. It currently plays in the Úrvalsdeild karla. In the 2018–19 season Selfoss won it first Icelandic Championships title when they beat  Haukar 35-25 and the series 3–1.

History
Selfoss currently plays in Úrvalsdeild karla. In the 2018–19 season Selfoss won it first Icelandic Championships title when they beat Haukar 35-25 and the series 3–1.

Men's team

Current squad
As of the 2022–23 season.

Goalkeepers 
 1  Vilius Rašimas
 12  Alexander Hrafnkelsson
 88  Jón Þórarinn Þorsteinsson
Left wingers
 8  Richard Sæþór Sigurðsson
 19  Hannes Höskuldsson
 22  Daníel Karl Gunnarsson
     Sigurður Snær Sigurjónsson
     Gunnar Flosi Grétarsson
Right wingers
 20  Guðjón Baldursson
   Sæþór Atlason
   Sölvi Svavarsson
Pivots 
 5  Elvar Elí Hallgrímsson
 10  Sverrir Pálsson
 13  Atli Ævar Ingólfsson

Left backs
 2  Karolis Stropus
 24  Einar Sverrisson
 44  Vilhelm Freyr Steindórsson
Central backs
 6  Guðmundur Hólmar Helgason
 33  Haukur Páll Hallgrímsson
 34  Tryggvi Sigurberg Traustason
Right backs
 9  Ísak Gústafsson
 11  Arni Steinn Steinþórsson
 18  Ragnar Jóhannsson

Notable former players

  Bjarki Már Elísson
  Einar Gunnar Sigurðsson
  Einar Þorvarðarson
  Elvar Örn Jónsson
  Gústaf Bjarnason
  Hannes Jón Jónsson
  Haukur Þrastarson
  Hergeir Grímsson
  Janus Daði Smárason
  Ómar Ingi Magnússon
  Ramunas Mikalonis  
  Sebastian Alexandersson
  Sigurður Sveinsson
  Sigfús Sigurðsson 
  Teitur Örn Einarsson
  Valdimar Grímsson
  Valdimar Þórsson
  Þórir Ólafsson
  Þórir Hergeirsson

Trophies 

Icelandic Championships (1):
: 2019
Icelandic 1. division (3):
: 1998, 2001, 2010
Icelandic 2. division (1):
: 1987

Recent history

European record

Matches 

Notes
 1R: First round
 2R: Second round
 3R: Third round
 L16: Round of 16
 QF: Quarter finals

Player of the Season

Managerial History
 Þorvaldur Þórðarson  (1978–79)
 Guðmundur Sigurbjörnsson (1981–82)
 Gunnlaugar Hjálmarsson (1983–85)
 Steindór Gunnarsson (1986–87)
 Helgi Ragnarsson (1987-1988)
 Guðmundur Magnússon (1988-1989)
 Björgvin Björgvinsson (1989-1991)
 Einar Þorvarðarson (1991-1994)
 Jezdimir Stankovic (1994-1995*)
 Valdimar Grímsson (1995-1996)
 Guðmundur Karlsson (1996-1997)
 Sigurjón Bjarnason (1997-1999)
 Einar Guðmundsson (1999-2002)
 Gísli Rúnar Guðmundsson (2002-2003)
 Sebastian Alexandersson (2003-2011)
 Arnar Gunnarsson (2011-2013)
 Gunnar Gunnarsson (2013-2015)
 Stefán Árnason (2015-2017)
 Patrekur Jóhannesson (2017-2019)
 Grímur Hergeirsson (2019-2020)
 Halldór Jóhann Sigfússon (2020-2022)
 Þórir Ólafsson (2022-)
 *Þórarinn Ingólfsson took charge in the middle of the season.

References

External links
 Official site
 Club profile at hsi.is

Handball teams in Iceland
Men's sport in Iceland
Selfoss